Benjamin Becker defeated his compatriot Simon Stadler in the final and won the title.

Seeds

Draw

Final four

Top half

Bottom half

References
 Main Draw
 Qualifying Draw

Aegean Tennis Cup - Singles
Ixian Grand Aegean Tennis Cup